Bobov Dol Thermal Power Plant is a coal-fired power plant situated in the lands of the village Golemo Selo near the town of Bobov Dol, Kyustendil Province in western Bulgaria.

The plant is located near the Bobov Dol coal mines and has installed capacity of 630 MW. One of the investors has proposed to add 2 new turbines to the 3 existing one with 210 MW each so that Bobov Dol TPP can reach 1,000 MW.

Its chimney is 200 metres tall .

See also

 Energy in Bulgaria

External links
Nikifor Vangelov plans to build two new turbines in Bobov Dol

Coal-fired power stations in Bulgaria
Buildings and structures in Kyustendil Province